Tansel Turgut (born 1966) is a Turkish-American cardiologist and chess player. He was born in Turkey, and moved to the US in 1992.

Turgut was the 1997 state chess champion of Louisiana, and the 1998 state champion of Michigan. In 2007, he earned the title of International Correspondence Chess Grandmaster,  the only grand master of correspondence chess from Turkey. The International Correspondence Chess Federation has given him the highest rating among US correspondence chess players; he also became a FIDE Master in over the board play in 2014.

His son, Aydin Turgut, is also a strong chess player.

References

External links
 
 
 

1966 births
Living people
Turkish chess players
American chess players
Chess FIDE Masters
Correspondence chess grandmasters
Turkish emigrants to the United States
American cardiologists